The 2006 Seniors Torneo Godó was the first edition of the Seniors Torneo Godó and it took place from April 20–23, 2006.

Tie breaks were used for the first two sets of each match, which was the best of three sets. If the score was tied at one set all, a "champions tie break" (the first player to win at least 10 points or by a margin of two points) would be used.

Sergi Bruguera won the inaugural edition by defeating Carlos Costa 6–1, 6–4 in the final.

Draw
The list of players was confirmed on 10 April 2006. Marcelo Ríos, winner of the first two tournaments at Doha and Hong Kong, was initially considered but later discarded.
  Sergi Bruguera
  Carlos Costa
  Andrés Gómez
  Martín Jaite
  Richard Krajicek
  John McEnroe
  Javier Sánchez
  Mats Wilander

Group stage

Red group

Blue group

Final four

Third-place playoff

Final

References

Seniors